"Senza scappare mai più" (English: "Without running away anymore") is a pop song written by Italian singer-songwriter Tiziano Ferro for his first compilation album, TZN - The Best of Tiziano Ferro, released on November 25, 2014. "Senza scappare mai più" was released as the album's lead single in early October 2014, it is also notable as being one of first Italian love songs sung from a male perspective to another man, and it's also one of Tiziano's first love songs focusing specifically on his first relationship with his (now) ex-boyfriend.

Music video
The video, directed by Gaetano Morbioli and produced by Federica Filipinos, was premiered in the Italian channel TV, Sky Uno, on October 27, 2014. In the video, plays his alter ego. Who plays the most important characters of his discography music. While current Tiziano Ferro, always present, walks among them singing Senza scappare mai più.

Track listing
Digital download (Italian)
"Senza scappare mai più" – 3:35

Digital download (Spanish)
"No Escaparé Nunca Más" – 3:35

7" (Only in Italy)
 7" vinyl
 "Senza scappare mai più"  – 3:35
 "Xdono" – 3:59

Charts

Weekly charts

Year-end charts

Certifications

References

External links
 Tiziano ferro official website
 "Senza scappare mai più" Official Music video

2014 singles
Italian-language songs
Tiziano Ferro songs
Songs written by Tiziano Ferro
2014 songs
EMI Records singles
Song recordings produced by Michele Canova